Erica Halloway (born 4 November 1984) is an Australian association football player, who currently plays for Western Sydney Wanderers in the Australian W-League.

Early life 
Born in Dubbo, a city located in the Orana region of New South Wales, Australia, Halloway played for the Bathurst City Panthers. In 2002, she earned Women's Super League player of the year honours.

Playing career
Halloway signed with Western Sydney Wanderers in 2015. In her 11 appearances with the team, she scored two goals. The team finished the regular season in seventh place. Halloway was awarded Western Sydney's W-League Player of the Year honours following her rookie season.

Honours 
 with Western Sydney Wanderers
 Western Sydney Wanderers W-League Player of the Year: 2015/16

 with Illawara Stingrays
 Player's Player of the Year: 2013

See also

References

Further reading
 Grainey, Timothy (2012), Beyond Bend It Like Beckham: The Global Phenomenon of Women's Soccer, University of Nebraska Press, 
 Stewart, Barbara (2012), Women's Soccer: The Passionate Game, Greystone Books,

External links
 Western Sydney Wanderers player profile 

Living people
Australian women's soccer players
Women's association football midfielders
Western Sydney Wanderers FC (A-League Women) players
A-League Women players
1984 births
People from Dubbo
Sportswomen from New South Wales
21st-century Australian women